Crossland College is a tertiary education institute situated in Priority Highlands, in Chanthar village in Brahmavar,   away from Udupi and  from Mangalore, in India.  The principal is currently Samuel K. Samuel.

References

External links
 

Colleges in Karnataka
Universities and colleges in Udupi district